Moris Pfeifhofer (born 18 October 1988 in Bülach) is a Swiss former competitive figure skater. He competed in the final segment at two European Championships (2007–2008) and four World Junior Championships (2005–2008). He is a three-time Swiss national medalist.

Pfeifhofer missed much of the 2008–2009 season due to injury. He retired from competitive skating in 2011.

Programs

Competitive highlights

References

External links 
 

 Official site

Swiss male single skaters
1988 births
Living people
People from Bülach
Sportspeople from the canton of Zürich